The Allerød oscillation was a warm and moist global interstadial that occurred c.13,900 to 12,900 BP, nearly at the end of the Last Glacial Period. It raised temperatures in the northern Atlantic region to almost present-day levels, before they declined again in the succeeding glacial Younger Dryas, which was followed by the present warm Holocene.

In some regions, especially in northern Eurasia, there is evidence for a cold period known as the Older Dryas interrupting the interstadial. In such regions the  shorter oscillation ending with the Older Dryas is known as the Bølling oscillation, and the Allerød period is the interstadial following the Older Dryas. The whole period is called the  Bølling–Allerød interstadial.

The Allerød period was named after a type site in Furesø Municipality in Sjælland, Denmark (near Copenhagen), where deposits created during the period were first identified in work published in 1901 by Hartz and Milthers. This Blytt–Sernander period corresponds to Pollen zone II.

Dating 
The start of the Allerød depends on whether an Older Dryas is present and how much time is to be allotted to the latter. A conventional date of 14,000 BP is typical. Roberts (1998) uses 13,000 BP for the end of the period.

The Greenland oxygen isotope record shows the warming identified with the Allerød to be after about 14,100 BP and before about 12,900 BP. C-14 dates from an excavation on the shore of Lake Neuchâtel, Switzerland, furnish a date of 14,000 BP, calibrated, for the start of the Allerød. Pollen cores from Berezina plain, Belarus, give 11,800–10,900 BP uncal. Various researchers have similar ranges: 12,000–11,000, 11,700–11,000, etc. They all seem to roughly concur. The interstadial ended abruptly with a decline in temperatures within a decade and the onset of the glacial Younger Dryas.

The Allerød occurred during the last interstadial of the Pleistocene: the Windermere interstadial of Britain, the Woodgrange interstadial of Ireland and the Two Creeks Interval of North America. Although interstadials are defined by region, the Allerød period is not, being global in its effects; that is, the temperature and sea level rose everywhere, not just in north Europe.

Flora 
During the Allerød, which foreshadowed the modern climate, mixed evergreen and deciduous forests prevailed in Eurasia, more deciduous toward the south, just as today. Birch, aspen, spruce, pine, larch and juniper were to be found extensively, mixed with oak and hazel. Grasses were to be found in more open regions.

Fauna 
Some animals hunted were the red deer, moose, horse, Irish elk and beaver. The ubiquitous brown bear was present as well.

Humans 
Humans in north Eurasia were still in the hunter-gatherer stage. A variety of Palaeolithic cultures prevailed in Europe: the Federmesser, Lyngby, Bromme, Ahrensburg and Swiderian. In the Levant, early alcohol use may have occurred during this time.

Sources

External links 
Belarus

Nordic Stone Age
Pleistocene events
Last Glacial Maximum
Blytt–Sernander system